Glyptostoma is a genus of air-breathing land snails, terrestrial pulmonate gastropod mollusks in the family Megomphicidae.

These are large (to about 40 mm or 1.5 inches in diameter) dark brown snails, much shorter than wide. They are found in hilly areas, or low mountains, along the Pacific coast of North America, from California to Baja California.

Species 
Species and subspecies within the genus Glyptostoma include:Glyptostoma at ITIS (Integrated Taxonomic Information System); accessed 12 Jan. 2008.Glyptostoma gabrielense Pilsbry, 1938Glyptostoma newberryanum (Binney, 1858)Glyptostoma newberryanum depressum'' Byant, 1902

References

Megomphicidae